The Bangladesh cricket team toured the United Arab Emirates in September 2022 to play two Twenty20 International (T20I) matches. The Bangladesh team was in Dubai to complete a training camp that had been interrupted by rain in Dhaka. The series was part of both teams' preparations for the 2022 ICC Men's T20 World Cup.

Squads

T20I series

1st T20I

2nd T20I

References

External links
Series home at ESPNcricinfo

2022 in Emirati cricket
2022 in Bangladeshi cricket
International cricket competitions in 2022–23